Kinda or Kindah may refer to:

Politics and society
Kinda (tribe), an ancient and medieval Arab tribe
Kingdom of Kinda, a tribal kingdom in north and central Arabia in –

Places
 Kinda, Idlib, Syria
 Kinda Hundred, a hundred in Sweden
 Kinda Municipality, a municipality in Sweden

Other uses
 Gadi Kinda (born 1994), Israeli footballer
 Kinda (crater), an impact crater on Mars
 Kinda (Doctor Who), a 1982 serial from the television programme Doctor Who
 Kinda baboon, a species of baboon located near Kinda, Congo

See also
 Kind (disambiguation)
 Kindai (disambiguation)
 Kinnda (born 1982), Swedish artist and songwriter